"Baby Blue" is a song by Welsh rock band Badfinger from their fourth studio album, Straight Up (1971). The song was written by Pete Ham, produced by Todd Rundgren, and released on Apple Records. As a single in the US in 1972, it went to #14. In 2013, the song was prominently featured in the series finale of the television show Breaking Bad. As a result, the song charted in the UK for the first time, reaching #73.

Writing and recording
Ham wrote the song about a woman named Dixie Armstrong, whom he had dated during Badfinger's last US tour. Guitarist Joey Molland recalled, "She came to one of the shows, they got talking and Pete really liked her. I don’t know whether they fell in love straight away, but he invited her on the road with us and she came along." Ham ultimately ended the relationship, partially as a result of Armstrong's lack of interest in Badfinger's recording and touring activities. Ham composed the song on acoustic guitar and Molland claims to have helped streamline the song's linking parts.

The song was recorded during sporadic sessions that started on 25 September 1971. It was further worked upon on 27 September before finally being completed on 6 October 1971, the final recording session for the album Straight Up. All sessions were held at George Martin's AIR Studios together with producer Todd Rundgren.

Release
"Baby Blue" was released as a single in the US on 6 March 1972, in a blue-tinted picture sleeve and featuring a new mix. Because Al Steckler, the head of Apple US, felt that it needed a stronger hook in the opening, he remixed the track with engineer Eddie Kramer in February 1972, applying heavy reverb to the snare during the first verse and middle eight. It was the group's last Top 20 single, peaking at #14 on the Billboard Pop Singles chart. It also reached #18 in South Africa.

However, the chaos that was enveloping the Apple UK operation at the time was strongly evident with regard to this song. While Apple US gave the song a picture sleeve and a remix to ensure that it was a hit, Apple UK remained unaware of its commercial potential. Although the single was assigned a release number for the UK (Apple 42), and had a scheduled release date of 10 March 1972, "Baby Blue" was never actually released as a single in the UK.

Resurgence of popularity
The song experienced a resurgence of popularity in 2013 when it was featured in the television program Breaking Bad during the closing scene of the series finale. Online streams increased in popularity immediately following the broadcast. According to Nielsen Soundscan, 5,300 downloads were purchased the night of the broadcast, and the song appeared on the Billboard Digital Songs chart at #32 the week ending October 19, 2013. Joey Molland, the last surviving member of the classic line-up of Badfinger, took to Twitter to express his excitement at the song's use in the finale and subsequently began to retweet news articles about the song's usage in the finale. It became a top-selling song on iTunes following the broadcast. As a result, the song charted in the UK for the first time, reaching #73. It also charted at #35 in Ireland.

Personnel
Pete Ham – lead vocals, rhythm guitar
Tom Evans – backing vocals, bass guitar
Joey Molland – lead guitar
Mike Gibbins – drums, percussion

Charts

Cover versions and other uses
Aimee Mann covered the song as the B-side to her 1993 single "I Should've Known".
Singer-songwriter Barbara Manning covered the song with her band, S.F. Seals, on the 1994 album Nowhere.

The song was briefly featured in the 2006 movie The Departed, directed by Martin Scorsese.
The song was also briefly used in the 2019 movie Annabelle Comes Home, which is a part of The Conjuring Universe.

References

Sources

External links
 
 

Apple Records singles
Badfinger songs
Breaking Bad
1972 singles
1972 songs
Songs written by Pete Ham
Song recordings produced by Todd Rundgren